The Nextcom R5000-HD is a popular Windows-based system for digitally capturing HD (high-definition) and SD (standard-definition) TV content from satellite TV and cable TV sources. A modification is required to the set-top box, giving it a USB 2.0 output that is connected to a PC. The digital video recorder (DVR) and companion personal video recorder (PVR) software runs on any Windows 2000, Windows XP, Windows 7 and Windows 10 system and can record just about any content (that is subscribed or free-to-air DTV) to hard disk or D-VHS tape. Programming can be encoded in MPEG-2, or MPEG-4 type AVC/H.264 formats. MPEG transport streams compliant with the ISO 13818-1 specification are created.

The R5000-HD differentiates itself from other DVR devices in that the captured MPEG data is an exact bit-for-bit replica of what is broadcast and encoded by the content provider. Other DVRs may encode the analog or composite signals from set-top box output jacks back into MPEG-2 digital data for PC storage, or can only digitally capture (without re-encoding) signals via over-the-air tuners. This significantly limits the amount content that can be recorded in a high-quality format. Decoding into the analog domain and then re-encoding back to digital (compression) is a lossy process resulting in visual and aural artifacts. Furthermore, satellite providers have access to very expensive state-of-the-art MPEG encoders that can provide unsurpassed quality at very low bitrate. It is advantageous to keep programs in this original form since it not only preserves quality but saves on storage space.

Companion PVR software allows users to program events using interactive TVelectronic program guides (EPGs) such as Zap2it and TitanTV. An especially useful feature is TitanTV remote scheduling which allows users to program events from anywhere they can get Internet access. The R5000-HD PVR software automatically retrieves these events from a central server. The R5000-HD also supports third-party PVRs like SageTV.

DVR systems such as the R5000-HD are alternatives to stand-alone devices such as TiVo and are increasingly popular with the growing number of home theater PC users. Although such solutions require more technical expertise to set up and use, they offer the ultimate in flexibility as to how media content is stored and distributed within a household.

External links 
Nextcom official site
Zap2it

Satellite television
Television technology
Multimedia